Orthonevra elegans is a species of small hoverflies in the subfamily Eristalinae. It is found in Europe and Asia.

References

External links 
 
 Chrysogaster elegans at insectoid.info
 Orthonevra elegans at insectoid.info

Eristalinae
Insects described in 1822
Diptera of Asia
Taxa named by Johann Wilhelm Meigen